Gilles Boizard (1 August 1933 – 5 May 1987) was a French composer.

Life 
Born in Juniville, Ardennes, Boizard, who grew up in a small village in the Ardennes, had piano lessons before studying at the Conservatoire de Paris with Yves Nat. After winning a second prize in 1959, he won the "Premier Grand Prix" in 1960 with the Cantate du Printemps in the competition for the Prix de Rome.

After a stay at the Villa Medici in Rome from 1961 to 1964, he returned to the Conservatoire de Paris, where he worked as professor for Solfège. A few years later he also became director of the competitions of the "Union Française des Artistes et Musiciens" (U.F.A.M). He also performed as a concert pianist and accompanist.

Boizard composed a number of chamber music works, as well as piano arrangements for the UCAM competitions and music pedagogical works.

Boizard died in Paris.

Works 
 Berceuse en carillon for piano, 1965
 Partita: Prélude, Aria, Interlude, Toccata for piano, 1965
 Offrande d'Automne for piano, 1966
 Diptyque "Aux statues de Bomarzo" for bass trombone and piano, 1967
 Par le sentier bleu for piano, 1968
 Musette for piano, 1969
 Deux Esquisses. A l'estompe. A la pointe sèche for harp, 1969
 Fantaisie for bassoon and piano, 1971
 Onze Leçons de solfège, avec accompagnement de piano, 2 vol., 1972
 Onze Leçons de solfège, sans accompagnement de piano, 2 vol, 1972
 Accordéondes for accordion, 1973
 Ballade for double bass and piano, 1977

External links 
 Gilles Boizard on Musimem

French classical composers
French male classical composers
20th-century French composers
Conservatoire de Paris alumni
Academic staff of the Conservatoire de Paris
Prix de Rome for composition
1933 births
1987 deaths
People from Ardennes (department)
20th-century French male musicians